Makedonski Sport was a daily newspaper from North Macedonia.

References

External links
 Official page

Newspapers published in North Macedonia
Macedonian-language newspapers